Hugh Johnston (1756–1829), Scottish-born merchant and politician in New Brunswick.

Hugh Johnston(e) may also refer to:

Hugh Johnston, Jr. (1790–1850), merchant and politician in New Brunswick, son of the above
Hugh Johnston, owner of WLLQ
Hugh Johnstone, colonel, British army administrator

See also
Hugh Johnson (disambiguation)